The Kyaw River is a river of upper Burma (Myanmar) in Magway Division.  It is a major tributary of the Yaw River which it enters just below the town of Pauk.

Notes and references

See also
List of rivers of Burma

Rivers of Myanmar